Jean Gainche (born 12 August 1932, in Remungol) was a French professional road bicycle racer. In 1958, Gainche won the 4th stage of the Tour de France.

Major results

1955
Plumeliau
1958
Carantec
GP Ouest-France
Locmalo
Tour de Champagne
Tour de France:
Winner stage 4
1959
Boucles de l'Aulne
Etoile du Léon
Leuhan
Morlaix
1961
Locmalo
Ronde de Seignelay
Valognes
Chateau-Chinon
1962
GP Ouest-France
Mi-Août Bretonne
1964
Guerlesquin
Hennebont
Plessala
1965
Lagorce-Laguirande
Pontrieux
1966
Quimper-Guez

External links 

Official Tour de France results for Jean Gainche

1932 births
Living people
Sportspeople from Morbihan
French male cyclists
French Tour de France stage winners
Cyclists from Brittany